Primerdesign is a UK-based biotechnology company that designs and sells products for quantitative real-time polymerase chain reaction (qPCR).

History 
Primerdesign was founded in 2005 by Dr Jim Wicks, Dr Rob Powell and Professor Tom Brown within the University of Southampton to focus on PCR and DNA chemistry. The company has grown since then and its products have been used in over 100 countries. The company has a portfolio of over 400 qPCR detection kits and over 9000 research targets.

Swine flu detection kit 
During the swine flu pandemic in 2009, Primerdesign developed the world's first swine flu detection kit. The kit, which was designed within a fortnight, was designed to give results within two hours. The first shipment of rapid result tests was dispatched to Mexico in April 2009 and is now being used in more than 30 countries.

Horse meat scandal 
The company responded to the 2013 meat adulteration scandal by being able to provide qPCR kits to quantitatively measure for horse meat in food.
Their kits were used throughout Ireland as well as the UK.

Coronavirus 
In January 2020 the company launched a molecular test for SARS-CoV-2. The test was approved as eligible for procurement under the World Health Organization's (WHO) Emergency Use Listing process in April 2020, meaning that the test can be supplied by the United Nations and other procurement agencies supporting the COVID-19 response. In the same month Novacyt announced a collaboration with AstraZeneca, GlaxoSmithKline and the University of Cambridge to support the UK in its COVID-19 national screening programme at a new testing laboratory at the university's Anne McLaren laboratory.

Products 
Among their product ranges are lines for:

 Pathogen detection kits
 House-keeping gene assays
 Genomic DNA detection kits
 Real-time PCR reagents
 geNorm reference gene selection kits
 Housekeeping gene selection kits
 Biobank Control cDNA
 High Resolution Melting analysis kits

Customers 
Primerdesign's customers include academic institutions, pharmaceutical companies, independent diagnostic laboratories, hospitals, and official government health agencies.

Sponsorship program 
In 2006, Primerdesign initiated a sponsorship program for PhD students and provide further assistance to the PCR component of their study.

See also 
 Real-time polymerase chain reaction
 High Resolution Melt
 COVID-19 testing

References

External links 
 Primerdesign website

Research support companies
Biotechnology companies of the United Kingdom
Biotechnology companies established in 2005
2005 establishments in the United Kingdom
British brands